The Inn at Mountain View, formerly the Dew Drop Inn, is a historic hotel property at 307 West Washington Street in Mountain View, Arkansas.  It is a -story wood-frame structure, roughly in a T shape, with a cross-gable roof configuration.  A single-story porch wraps around one portion of the T, supported by square posts mounted on dressed stone pedestals.  Built c. 1920, it is one of two hotel buildings to survive from that period in the city.

The building was listed on the National Register of Historic Places in 1985.

See also
National Register of Historic Places listings in Stone County, Arkansas

References

External links
Inn at Mountain View web site

Hotel buildings on the National Register of Historic Places in Arkansas
Hotel buildings completed in 1920
Buildings and structures in Mountain View, Arkansas
Bed and breakfasts in the United States
National Register of Historic Places in Stone County, Arkansas